William Harrison Sapp House is a historic home located near Tradesville, Lancaster County, South Carolina. It was built about 1897, and extensively remodeled in 1912. It is a two-story Colonial Revival style frame residence with a one-story rear projection.  It features a one-story hipped-roof wraparound porch, supported by Tuscan order columns. A small one-story gable-front frame drug store/office built in 1912, is located on the property.  Dr. William Harrison Sapp (1866-1946), was a prominent local physician and farmer.

It was added to the National Register of Historic Places in 1990.

References

Houses on the National Register of Historic Places in South Carolina
Houses completed in 1912
Colonial Revival architecture in South Carolina
Houses in Lancaster County, South Carolina
National Register of Historic Places in Lancaster County, South Carolina
1912 establishments in South Carolina